The 2004 Hajj stampede resulted in the deaths of at least 251 pilgrims on 1 February 2004 during the Hajj in Mecca. The incident took place during the ritual stoning of three pillars in the Mina valley, close to Mecca, on the final day of Hajj ceremonies. More than 200 people were injured, and the incident became the worst tragedy during the Hajj since 1990.

See also
Incidents during the Hajj

References

2004 disasters in Saudi Arabia
2004 in Saudi Arabia
20th century in Mecca
Disasters in religious buildings and structures
Incidents during the Hajj
Human stampedes in 2004
Human stampedes in Saudi Arabia